Patrick Lawrence Murphy (March 17, 1857 – October 6, 1911) was a Canadian outfielder in Major League Baseball for the Washington Statesmen.

Born in Toronto, Ontario, he made his major league debut on May 30, 1891, at the age of 34. He would only play that one season. He played in 101 games with an .265 batting average, 1 home run, 35 runs batted in and 29 stolen bases.

External links

1857 births
1911 deaths
19th-century baseball players
Baseball players from Toronto
Buffalo Bisons (minor league) players
Canadian expatriate baseball players in the United States
Chattanooga Chatts players
Canadian baseball players
Canadian sportspeople of Irish descent
Major League Baseball outfielders
Washington Statesmen players
Major League Baseball players from Canada
St. Paul Apostles players
Minneapolis Millers (baseball) players
Indianapolis Hoosiers (minor league) players
New Haven Nutmegs players